Linden is located between Amherst and Pugwash, in Cumberland County Nova Scotia. It is an old farming community.

References

Linden on Destination Nova Scotia

Communities in Cumberland County, Nova Scotia